The 1979 Firecracker 400 was a NASCAR Winston Cup Series racing event that took place on July 4, 1979, at Daytona International Speedway in Daytona Beach, Florida.

Race report
There were 41 drivers on the starting grid of this race; Bruce Hill was credited with the last-place finish due to an engine problem on the first lap. Fifteen drivers would fail to finish the race with problems varying from engine trouble, blown tires, and crashes. Claude Ballot-Léna from France would make his final NASCAR Cup Series appearance here; winning $1,130. ($ when adjusted for inflation). His race ended on lap 83 of 160 with engine problems.

Forty-five thousand fans were in attendance. The average speed was a record . The green flag waved at 10 a.m. Darrell Waltrip would become a frequent contender for the first-place position along with Buddy Baker and Neil Bonnett. Bonnett would go on to defeat Benny Parsons by a single second.

Terry Labonte went head on into the outside wall in one of the corners just past the halfway point and was sliding back down the track when Bobby Allison suddenly spun sideways and clobbered the #44 right in the door. Neither driver was hurt but the heavy crash put both drivers out of the race.

Notable crew chiefs who participated in the race include Buddy Parrott, Joey Arrington, Kirk Shelmerdine, Darrell Bryant, Dale Inman, Harry Hyde, Waddell Wilson, Bud Moore, Tim Brewer, and Jake Elder.

A souvenir program was sold for $3 USD ($ when adjusted for inflation). Kyle Petty attempted to qualify for this race, but crashed during qualifying with the consequence of having to work on his father's pit crew. He would make his NASCAR debut at Talladega.

Qualifying
Buddy Baker would score the pole, averaging , a new track record at the time.

Finishing order

Standings after the race

References

Firecracker 400
Firecracker 400
NASCAR races at Daytona International Speedway